Square United is a Saint Lucian football club based in Vieux Fort, competing in the Saint Lucia Gold Division, the top tier of Saint Lucian football.Their club colours are maroon, red, white and navy blue. Their motto is " Working together for the betterment of all".

References

Square United